A Woman in Love and War: Vera Brittain was a television documentary on the life of Vera Brittain and her experiences in the First World War.  It was first broadcast on Remembrance Sunday 2008 on BBC One.  It was presented by Jo Brand. The programme included interviews with Brittain's daughter Shirley Williams, Brittain's biographer Mark Bostridge, and Roland Leighton's nephew David Leighton.

External links

2008 television films
2008 films
British television films
BBC television documentaries about history during the 20th Century
2000s British films